Maximiliano de Austria (13 November 1555 – 1 July 1614) was a Roman Catholic prelate who served as Archbishop of Santiago de Compostela (1603–1614), Bishop of Segovia (1601–1603), and Bishop of Cádiz (1596–1601).

Biography
Maximiliano de Austria was born in Jaén, Spain as illegitimate son of Leopoldo de Austria, Bishop of Córdoba and illegitimate son of Maximilian I, Holy Roman Emperor. On 23 September 1596, he was appointed during the papacy of Pope Clement VIII as Bishop of Cádiz. On 16 February 1597, he was consecrated bishop by Bernardo Sandoval Rojas, Bishop of Jaén. On 27 August 1601, he was appointed during the papacy of Pope Clement VIII as Bishop of Segovia. On 21 April 1603, he was appointed during the papacy of Pope Clement VIII as Archbishop of Santiago de Compostela. He served as Archbishop of Santiago de Compostela until his death on 1 July 1614.

See also 
Catholic Church in Spain

References

External links and additional sources
 (for Chronology of Bishops)  
 (for Chronology of Bishops) 
 (for Chronology of Bishops) 
 (for Chronology of Bishops) 
 (for Chronology of Bishops) 
 (for Chronology of Bishops) 

16th-century Roman Catholic bishops in Spain
17th-century Roman Catholic archbishops in Spain
1555 births
1614 deaths
Bishops appointed by Pope Clement VIII